= Christiana Olusola Ogunfolaju =

Nigerian politician and public administrator

- Occupations: Public administrator, politician
- Known for: Special Adviser on Commerce, Industry and Cooperative, Osun State

Christiana Olusola Ogunfolaju is a Nigerian public administrator and political figure who served as a government appointee in Osun State, Nigeria, including as Special Adviser on Commerce, Industry and Cooperative under the administration of Governor Gboyega Oyetola.

== Career ==
Ogunfolaju has served in public administration in Osun State, Nigeria. She has served as Special Adviser on Commerce, Industry and Cooperative during the administration of Governor Gboyega Oyetola, where she was part of the team responsible for supporting the state government's policies in commerce and industrial development.

Her role involved contributing to economic and cooperative development policies within the state government and assisting in the implementation of programmes related to trade and industry.

== Government nomination and screening ==
In 2019, Ogunfolaju was among individuals nominated for executive roles by the Osun State governor and screened by the Osun State House of Assembly.During the screening exercise, nominees presented their credentials and experience before lawmakers as part of the constitutional process required for confirmation into executive positions within the state government.

== Political involvement ==
Ogunfolaju well known for her involvement in political activities within Osun State, especially within the ruling party structures where she has been known for her support and contributions to party development and unity.Kakaki Oodua.
